Out of the Inkwell is an American major animated series of the silent era produced by Max Fleischer from 1918 to 1929.

History
The series was the result of three short experimental films that Max Fleischer independently produced from 1914 to 1916 to demonstrate his invention, the rotoscope, a device consisting of a film projector and easel used to achieve realistic movement for animated cartoons. The rotoscope projected motion picture film through an opening in the easel, covered by a glass pane serving as a drawing surface.  The image on the projected film was traced onto paper, advancing the film one frame at a time as each drawing was made. Fleischer's younger brother Dave Fleischer, who was working as a clown at Coney Island, served as the model for their first famous character, eventually known as Koko the Clown.

Out of the Inkwell began at the Bray Studio as a monthly entry in The Bray Pictograph Screen Magazine produced for Paramount from 1918, and later for Goldwyn Pictures from 1919 to 1921. In that same year, The Fleischer brothers started their own studio, and in 1923, the clown who previously had no name came to be known as Koko when animation veteran Dick Huemer became the new director of animation.

Huemer, who began his animation career with the Mutt and Jeff cartoons in 1916, brought the influence of the short and tall companions to Out of the Inkwell with the creation of a small canine companion named Fitz, who later evolved into Bimbo in the sound era.  Huemer redesigned the clown for animation, which reduced Fleischer's dependency on the Rotoscope for fluid animation.  He also defined the drawing style with his distinctive inking quality that the series was famous for. But it was the interaction of the live-action sequences with the artist/creator, Max Fleischer, and his pen and ink creations that were the foundation of the series. Typically, the cartoons start with live-action showing Max drawing the characters on paper, or opening the inkwell to release the characters into "reality."

The Out of the Inkwell series ran from 1918 to mid 1927, and was renamed The Inkwell Imps for Paramount, continuing until 1929. In all, 62 Out of the Inkwell and 56 Inkwell Imps films were produced in eleven years. The Inkwell Imps series was replaced by the "Talkartoons" in 1929, and Koko was retired until 1931, appearing as a supporting character with Bimbo and Betty Boop. Koko's last theatrical appearance was in the Betty Boop cartoon Ha-Ha-Ha (1934),  a remake of the silent Out of the Inkwell film The Cure (1924).  Koko had a brief cameo in his only color theatrical appearance in the Screen Song entry Toys will be Toys (1949).

In 1950, Stuart Productions released a number of the Inkwell Studios Out of the Inkwell cartoons, and a selection of the Paramount Inkwell Imps cartoons to television. In 1955, the Inkwell Imps, along with 2,500 pre-October 1950 Paramount shorts and cartoons were sold to television packagers, the majority acquired by U.M. & M. TV Corporation.

In 1958, Max Fleischer revived his studio in a partnership with Hal Seeger, and in 1960 produced a series of one hundred Out Of The Inkwell five-minute cartoons. In the new color series, Koko had a clown girlfriend named Kokette, a pal named Kokonut, and a villain named Mean Moe. Larry Storch provided the voice for Koko and all of the supporting characters.

Many of the shorts in the original series are now in the public domain. One short in the series, 1922's The Hypnotist, was preserved by the Academy Film Archive in 2010.

Filmography

The following is an attempt to list the complete filmography of the Out of the Inkwell/Inkwell Imps shorts, assembled from the best surviving documentation.

The Bray Studio Years (1918–1921)

Inkwell Studio: Out of The Inkwell years 1921–1926

Inkwell Imps (1927–1929)

References

External links

Max Fleischer's Famous Out of the Inkwell, Inkwell Images

Film series introduced in 1918
1918 films
Mass media franchises introduced in 1918
Animated film series
1910s animated short films
1920s animated short films
Fleischer Studios short films
American black-and-white films
Television series by U.M. & M. TV Corporation
American silent short films
Rotoscoped films
Articles containing video clips
Short film series
Comedy films about clowns
Bray Productions film series
Animated films without speech
1910s American films
Silent American comedy films